The 1930 Oklahoma gubernatorial election was held on November 4, 1930, and was a race for Governor of Oklahoma. Democrat  William H. 'Alfalfa Bill' Murray defeated Republican Ira A. Hill.  Also on the ballot were Independent candidates B. G. Bingham and John Franing.

Democratic primary
Nine candidates vied for the Democratic nomination, including former governor Martin E. Trapp.  Former Congressman and Speaker of the Oklahoma House of Representatives 'Alfalfa Bill' Murray and Frank Buttram advanced to the runoff where Murray defeated Buttram by a wide margin.

Primary Results

Primary Runoff results

Republican primary
Ira A. Hill received more than 50% of the vote in defeating his two challengers, thus avoiding a runoff.

Results

Results

References

1930
Gubernatorial
Okla